This is a compilation of every international soccer game played by the United States men's national soccer team from 1970 through 1979. It includes the team's record for that year, each game and the date played. It also lists the U.S. goal scorers.

The format is: home team listed first, U.S. listed first at home or neutral site.

Records are in win–loss–tie format. Games decided in penalty kicks are counted as ties, as per the FIFA standard.

1970

1971

1972

1973

1974

1975

1976

1977

1978

1979

External links
 USA - Details of International Matches 1970-1979
 USA Men's National Team: All-time Results, 1885-1989
 U.S. SOCCER FEDERATION 2016 MEN’S NATIONAL TEAM MEDIA GUIDE

1970
1970 in American soccer
1971 in American soccer
1972 in American soccer
1973 in American soccer
1974 in American soccer
1975 in American soccer
1976 in American soccer
1977 in American soccer
1978 in American soccer
1979 in American soccer